The 2022 USFL Draft, also known as the 2022 USFL Player Selection Meeting, was the player selection process to fill the rosters of the eight teams for the 2022 USFL season. The draft was held on February 22–23, 2022, with results released through the USFL's social media channels.

Structure 
The USFL player allocation process was held in multiple phases, separated by position groups. The league used a "snake" format in each phase, in which the draft order reversed with each round. The draft order was shuffled for each phase as predetermined through lotteries. A draft pool of 450–500 players were eligible to be picked by signing contracts before the draft. The structure of the draft was as follows:

Day 1:
 Round 1: Quarterbacks
 Rounds 2–4: Defensive Ends
 Round 5–7: Offensive Tackles
 Round 8–11: Cornerbacks
 Round 12: Quarterbacks

Day 2:
 Round 13–17: Wide Receivers
 Round 18–19: Safeties
 Round 20: Centers
 Round 21: Inside Linebackers
 Round 22–23: Guards
 Round 24–26: Defensive Tackles
 Round 27–28 Running Backs
 Round 29–31: Outside Linebackers
 Round 32: Kickers
 Round 33: Punters
 Round 34: Tight Ends
 Round 35: Long Snappers

Day 1

Round 1: Quarterbacks

Round 2–4: Defensive Ends

Round 5–7: Offensive Tackles

Round 8–11: Cornerbacks

Round 12: Quarterbacks

Day 2

Round 13–17: Wide Receivers

Rounds 18–19: Safeties

Round 20: Centers

Round 21: Inside Linebackers

Rounds 22–23: Guards

Rounds 24–26: Defensive Tackles

Rounds 27–28: Running backs

Rounds 29–31: Outside linebackers

Round 32: Kickers

Round 33: Punters

Round 34: Tight ends

Round 35: Long snappers

Supplemental draft
A supplemental draft was held on March 10, 2022, with an additional 80 players selected to fill three final roster spots and seven practice squad spots per team.

Notes

References

USFL
2022 USFL season
USFL Draft
Events in Birmingham, Alabama
American football in Birmingham, Alabama
USFL Draft